Unexpected Race is a 2018 American fantasy film starring Jack Black, Jon Heder and Clint Pulver. Unexpected Race was written, directed, and produced by Stephen Groo.

The film premiered at the 2018 Sydney Underground Film Festival. Jack Black was introduced to director Groo's films by Jared Hess, director of Napoleon Dynamite and Nacho Libre.  Black who starred in Nacho Libre became a huge fan of Groo's and volunteered to take part in Unexpected Race.

Plot
A young woman named Amber is sent to live with her father, someone she hasn't seen since a car accident that took the life of her mother more than 10 years ago.  Amber finds an elf named Lythorin hiding in the woods, trying to elude an FBI agent tasked to destroy all elves.  Amber and Lythorin fall in love and the elf must decide if he wants to stay alone or be with Amber.

Cast

Sariah Hopkin as Amber
Jack Black as Sheriff
Clint Pulver as Lythorin 
 Cherie Julander as Lylerine
 Crystal Hatfield as Zara
Jon Heder as Harry
Jared Hess as Deputy
 Adam Colvin as Deputy
 Stacylyn Bennett as Mother
 Ruel Brown as Father
Eric Robertson as Special Forces
Bob Richardson as Agent Hardman
Brandon Arnold as Special Forces
  Micah Dahl Anderson as Special Forces
James Alexander as FBI Agent
 Tyson Riskas as Agent Forest

References

External links
 

2018 films
American fantasy films
2018 fantasy films
Films shot in Utah
2010s English-language films
2010s American films